The following is a list of released songs recorded and performed by Ace of Base.

Ace Thursdays 
Beginning on March 3, 2011, the band has released different demo tracks and alternative versions of released and unreleased songs on their Facebook page on certain Thursdays for free. Some of them were later officially released in the 2015 album Hidden Gems.

 "A Million Ways" (February 28, 2013)
 "All Temptations" (November 10, 2011)
 "At The Borderline" (October 27, 2011)
 "Barfly" (July 7, 2011)
 "Beautiful Life" (Instrumental Choir Version) (March 24, 2011)
 "Beautiful Morning" (Original Production) (March 17, 2011)
 "Blah Blah Blah" (Remix) (October 11, 2012)
 "Bodyhouse" (Edited Version) (September 27, 2012)
 "Cecilia" (Ole Evenrude Playback) (November 17, 2011)
 "Change with the Light" (Original Instrumental) (November 10, 2011)
 "Change with the Light" (Original Production) (March 10, 2011)
 "Close to You" (Remix) (November 29, 2012)
 "Come to Me" (March 24, 2011)
 "Come to Me" (Early Instrumental) (March 3, 2011)
 "Cuba Cuba Libre" (March 24, 2011)
 "Cuba Cuba Libre" (d'Cats Reggae Version) (November 17, 2011)
 "Cuba Cuba Libre" (Second Version) (September 27, 2012)
 "Cruel Summer" (Original Version) (July 7, 2011)
 "Cruel Summer" (TOTP Version) (April 14, 2011)
 "Da Capo" (Original Version) (March 17, 2011)
 "Dancer In A Daydream" (Instrumental) (October 27, 2011)
 "Don't Turn Around" (TOTP Instrumental) (April 7, 2011)
 "Dr. Sun" (Instrumental) (November 17, 2011)
 "End Of This World" (March 31, 2011)
 "Funk Funk" (February 28, 2013)
 "Girl in the Line" (March 3, 2011)
 "Giving It Up" (March 10, 2011)
 "Giving It Up" (Alternate Version) (April 7, 2011)
 "Go Go Go, Dr. Beat" (March 10, 2011)
 "Go Go Go, Dr. Beat" (Second version) (April 14, 2011)
 "Hallo Hallo" (Demo Version) (March 31, 2011)
 "Hey Sorry" (d'Cats Version) (April 14, 2011)
 "Hipnotize" (April 14, 2011)
 "For a Thousand Days" (March 10, 2011)
 "Juliet" (Unreleased Version) (February 28, 2013)
 "Killer On The Rampage" (March 31, 2011)
 "Kyrie Eleisson" (October 27, 2011)
 "L'Amour" (Original Version) (March 17, 2011)
 "Learn How to Fly" (d'Cats Version) (October 11, 2012)
 "Look Around Me" (February 28, 2013)
 "Love in December" (Alternate Version) (March 3, 2011)
 "Love in December" (Original Version) (November 3, 2011)
 "Love in the Barrio" (d'Cats version) (April 14, 2011)
 "Love in the Barrio"  (April 14, 2011)
 "Love in the Ghetto" (July 7, 2011)
 "Memories Forever" (July 7, 2011)
 "Memories Forever" (Alternate Version) (November 3, 2011)
 "Moment of Magic" (April 7, 2011)
 "Moment of Magic" (Slow Version) (March 3, 2011)
 "My Déjà Vu" (Instrumental) (March 10, 2011)
 "Never Gonna Say I'm Sorry" (I'm Like a Clown Extended Bit) (April 7, 2011)
 "Never Gonna Say I'm Sorry" (First Day Instrumental) (April 14, 2011)
 "No Good Lover" (Demo Version) (March 17, 2011)
 "One Day" (Remix) (October 11, 2012)
 "Opposites Attract" (July 7, 2011)
 "Pole Position" (November 10, 2011)
 "Reality (In Black and White)" (November 10, 2011)
 "Scared Boys" (November 3, 2011)
 "Sharpshooter" (Remix) (November 29, 2012)
 "She Was Thinking of You" (March 31, 2011)
 "Shoot Me (With a Camera)" (November 10, 2011)
 "Show Me Love" (First Ace Version) (April 14, 2011)
 "Sunset in Southern California" (December 29, 2011)
 "The Challenge" (March 24, 2011)
 "The Duel" (March 10, 2011)
 "The Golden Eye" (Meja Version) (April 7, 2011)
 "The Wizard" (November 3, 2011)
 "Tho Tho Thoa" (d'Cats Version) (February 28, 2013)
 "Unspeakable" (Choir Version) (April 14, 2011)
 "Vida Hermosa" (April 7, 2011)
 "Vision in Blue" (Demo Version) (September 27, 2012)
 "Walk Like a Man" (March 31, 2011)
 "What's The Name Of The Game" (Cowboy Lyrics Version) (April 14, 2011)
 "Wheel of Fortune" (1991 Original Version) (November 29, 2012)
 "World Down Under" (Fast Version) (March 17, 2011)
 "Would You Believe" (March 24, 2011)
 "Would You Believe" (d'Cats Version) (March 3, 2011)
 "Would You Believe" (Summer Version) (March 24, 2011)

Live songs
 "All You Need Is Love" (Night of The Proms, 2005)
 "Nazad, Nazad Mome Kalino" (Lovech, Bulgaria, 2008)
 "Sång" (Princess Victoria's 20th birthday, 1997)
 "Vårvindar Friska" (Viña del Mar Festival, 1996)

External links
Ace of Base — Official Website
Facebook — Ace of Base on Facebook
Reverbnation — Ace of Base on Reverbnation

References

Ace of Base